Ashok Chavan was sworn in as Chief Minister of Maharashtra for the first time in 2008, after his predecessor, Vilasrao Deshmukh resigned the office in the aftermath of 2008 Mumbai terrorist attacks. The first Chavan ministry governed until the 2009 Maharashtra Legislative Assembly election, which resulted in a victory for Chavan-led Congress-NCP alliance and Chavan forming his second ministry.

List of ministers
The initial Chavan cabinet consisted of 26 cabinet members,  including Chavan and his deputy, Chhagan Bhujbal, as well as the following cabinet ministers:

References

Indian National Congress
2008 in Indian politics
C
Nationalist Congress Party
Cabinets established in 2008
Cabinets disestablished in 2009
2008 establishments in Maharashtra
2009 disestablishments in India